Cattail Branch is a  long third-order tributary to Saulsbury Creek in Kent County, Delaware.

Variant names
According to the Geographic Names Information System, it has also been known historically as:
Cat Tail Branch

Course
Cattail Branch rises on the Green Branch divide about 1-mile west-northwest of Layton Corners, Delaware, and then flows generally south to join Saulsbury Creek about 0.5 miles north of Adamsville, Delaware.

Watershed
Cattail Branch drains  of area, receives about 44.7 in/year of precipitation, and is about 5.83% forested.

See also
List of rivers of Delaware

References

Rivers of Delaware
Rivers of Kent County, Delaware